Abortion in Fiji is legal if the abortion will save the woman's life or if the pregnancy gravely endangers the woman's physical or mental health. However, generally the law does not allow voluntary abortion as it is against religious beliefs, since Fiji is a stronghold of Christianity with other religious beliefs that prohibit abortion. Abortion in Fiji is a taboo; however, according to statistics, teenage pregnancy has become a prevalent issue and young mothers end up having abortions. In 2010, abortions to end pregnancies that are a result of rape or incest became legally available to women. In Fiji, any approved abortion requires authorisation from a physician.

References 

Healthcare in Fiji
Fiji
Fiji